MATC may refer to:

 Madison Area Technical College
 Maximum Acceptable Toxicant Concentration
 Milwaukee Area Technical College
 Mountainland Technical College (formerly known as the Mountainland Applied Technology College)
 Manhattan Area Technical College
 Air Traffic Control Maintenance